The Asia Minor Slavs were the historical South Slav communities relocated by the Byzantine Empire from the Balkans to Asia Minor (Anatolia). After Maurice's Balkan campaigns (582–602) and during the subduing of the Slavs in the Balkans in the 7th and the 8th centuries, large communities were forcefully relocated to Anatolia as military units to fight the Umayyad Caliphate.

History

7th century
The earliest evidence for a relocation of Slavs from the Balkans may be a seal dated to 650. In 658 and 688/9 the Byzantines invited groups of Slavic settlers to Bithynia. Constans II settled captured Slavs in Asia Minor, and 5,000 of these joined Abdulreman ibn Khalid in 664-665.

There was a town in Bithynia known as Gordoservon, mentioned in 680–81, whose name possibly derived from the Serbs resettled there from the areas "around river Vardar" by Byzantine Emperor Constans II (r. 641–668), in the mid-7th century (in ca. 649 or 667).

Justinian II (685-695) also settled as many as 30,000 Slavs from Thrace in Asia Minor, in an attempt to boost military strength. Most of them however, with their leader Neboulos, deserted to the Arabs at the Battle of Sebastopolis in 692.

8th century
Bulgar aggression in northern Greece prompted the Byzantine state to relocate a large number of Slavs in 758 under Constantine V, and again in 783 out of fear that they would side with the Bulgars during an invasion.

The Bulgar expansion caused massive Slav migrations, and in 762 more than 200,000 people fled to Byzantine territory and were relocated to Asia Minor.

The most prominent among the Asia Minor Slavs was Thomas the Slav, a military commander who raised most of the empire in an unsuccessful revolt against Michael II the Amorian in the early 820s. Although the 10th-century chronicler Genesios calls him "Thomas from Lake Gouzourou, of Armenian race", most modern scholars support his Slavic descent and believe his birthplace to have been near Gaziura in the Pontus.

By the middle of the 9th century, the Asia Minor Slavs were integrated within the Bulgarian nationality.

10th century
The Slavs of the Opsician Theme (Sklabesianoi) are still attested as a separate group in the 10th century, serving as marines in the Byzantine navy.

12th century
The Serbs rose up against the Byzantines in 1127–29, probably with Hungarian support. After the Byzantine victory, part of the Serb population was deported to Asia Minor.

See also
Mardaites

References

Sources

Erdeljanović, J. "O naseljavanju Slovena u Maloj Aziji i Siriji od VII do X veka" Glasnik geografskog društva; vol. VI 1921 p. 189

Niederle, Lubor, Slovanske starožitnosti; Dilu II, (2 vols.) Prague, 1934, pp. 389–399, 444-446
Ostrogorski, G. "Bizantisko-Južnoslovenski odnosi", Enciklopedija Jugoslavije; 1, Zagreb, 1955, pp. 591–599

 

South Slavic history
Byzantine Anatolia
Military units and formations of the Byzantine Empire